George Manoli Loupassi (born June 8, 1967, in Richmond, Virginia) is an American politician of the Republican Party. From 2008 to 2018, he was a member of the Virginia House of Delegates. He  represented the 68th district, made up of parts of the city of Richmond and Chesterfield County.

Personal life and non-political career
Loupassi was born in Richmond, Virginia. His father was an immigrant from Crete who became a restaurateur and real estate investor.

Loupassi attended St. Christopher's School in Richmond and Washington & Lee University in Lexington, Virginia.  He received his Juris Doctor (J.D.) degree at the University of Richmond School of Law.

Loupassi married Rebecca Stewart; they  children Doxey, Stewart, and Manoli.

Political career
Loupassi became treasurer of the Richmond Republican Committee in 1998. He was elected to the Richmond City Council in 2000 representing the 1st district in the city's West End. Prior to 2005 the Mayor of Richmond was the City Council's chair, chosen by its members. In that year, the city switched to a directly elected at-large mayor, choosing Douglas Wilder. The Council chair became known as the President of the City Council, and the Council chose Loupassi.

On November 6, 2007, Loupassi defeated independent incumbent Katherine Waddell and was elected to a seat in the Virginia House of Delegates representing portions of Chesterfield County and the City of Richmond.

On February 9, 2009, Delegate Loupassi voted against SB 1105, known as the Indoor Clean Air Act (prohibits smoking in all indoor restaurants and bar and lounge areas in State). The bill was passed with a vote of 59 Y – 39 N.

2007 election results

2017 election results

Notes

References

Manoli Loupassi (Constituent/campaign website)

 (Loupassi law firm website)

External links

1967 births
Living people
Republican Party members of the Virginia House of Delegates
Virginia lawyers
American people of Greek descent
Washington and Lee University alumni
University of Richmond School of Law alumni
Politicians from Richmond, Virginia
Place of birth missing (living people)
21st-century American politicians
St. Christopher's School (Richmond, Virginia) alumni